Kahn-e Bala (also Romanized as Kahn-e Bālā; also known as Kahn-e Bālā’ī, Kahn-e Barānī, and Kohan-e ‘Olyā) is a village in Talang Rural District, Talang District, Qasr-e Qand County, Sistan and Baluchestan Province, Iran. At the 2006 census, its population was 651, with 146 families.

References 

Populated places in Qasr-e Qand County